The Libro d'Oro (English: The Golden Book), originally published between 1315 and 1797, is the formal directory of nobles in the Republic of Venice (including the Ionian Islands). It has been resurrected as the Libro d'Oro della Nobiltà Italiana (English: The Golden Book of Italian Nobility), a privately published directory of the nobility of Italy. The book lists some of Italy's noble families and their cadet branches.

History

Venetian Libro d'oro
In the oligarchic Republic of Venice the series of restrictions to eligibility for membership in the Great Council that began in 1297 with the decreed Serrata del Maggior Consiglio, or closing of the Great Council, resulted in 1315 in the compiling of a directory of members of eligible families, the Libro d'Oro or "Golden Book". The book was permanently closed in 1797, with the fall of the Venetian Republic.

19th century
In 1896 the Libro d'oro was founded. Its members were families who had obtained decrees granting, renewing or confirming a title of nobility by the king or royal decrees or ministerial recognition of a noble title. It was intended to avoid abuses and usurpations in the maintenance of existing titles in the pre-unification states and was responsible for keeping a "record of noble titles" in which membership was compulsory for the public use the titles. In 1889 a list of families who had obtained decrees granting or recognition of titles of nobility after the unification of Italy was drawn up, as were 14 regional lists, where families were already recorded in the official lists of states pre-unification.

It was initially an official register kept in the State Central State in Rome compiled by the heraldry consultants of the Kingdom of Italy, a government body established in 1869 at the Ministry of the Interior.

Early 20th century
First published in its current form in 1910, it includes some 2,500 families, and may not be considered exhaustive. Included are those listed in the earlier register of the  Libro d’Oro della Consulta Araldica del Regno d’Italia and the later Elenchi Ufficiali Nobiliari of 1921 and of 1933.

In 1921 it was decreed as the “Official list of noble and titled families of the Kingdom of Italy". The list included all family members already in the regional registers, but it marked with an asterisk those who had obtained title by royal or ministerial decree. In 1933 a second '"Official List of the Italian nobility" was decreed, to which was attached a list of requirements to establish nobility. Those enrolled in the Italian Official lists of nobility (1921–1933 and SUPL. 1934–36) had three years to provide documentation for inclusion in the Golden Book of 1933, so this is much shorter than the 1921 edition.

After the Second World War

Following the Second World War and the decision by a referendum to abolish its monarchy, the new Italian Republic officially ended its recognition of titles and hereditary honours in its new constitution of Italy, so ceased to maintain the Consulta Araldica, an official government body regulating the nobility which had been a department of the Ministry of the Interior. No titles are now recognized.  Only those families bearing titles before 28 October 1922 (i.e. before the rise to power of Fascism) were permitted to use predicates of such titles as a part of their names.  These laws did not apply to the Papal nobility of Rome, insofar as their titles had been created by the Pope, when he was a sovereign head of state of the Papal States (i.e. until the Capture of Rome on 20 September 1870).  After a period of uncertainty, the Italian aristocracy continued to use their titles in the same way as they had in previous centuries.  This behaviour was cemented by the continued publication of Il Libro d'Oro della Nobiltà Italiana, published as much to prevent self-styled aristocrats from social climbing as to list the established nobility.

Current status
 

The Libro d'Oro della Nobiltà Italiana ("Golden Book of the Italian Nobility") is regularly published by the Collegio Araldico of Rome. It should not be confused with a social register - wealth, status and social contacts are of no consideration on the decision as to whether a person may be included in the book, the only consideration is the blood or marital relationship to the head of a noble family. Nor is it a peerage reference such as those published in Great Britain (e.g., Debrett's Peerage & Baronetage, Burke's Peerage). The currently published Libro d'Oro is not an official publication of the Italian state, which currently does not have a civic office to recognise titles of nobility or personal coats of arms. The most recent (25th) edition of Libro d'Oro della Nobiltà Italiana was published in 2014 http://www.collegioaraldicoromano.it/libro-d-oro

It is structured in volumes divided into two series:
 Golden Book of the Italian nobility, old series in 11 volumes
 Golden Book of the Italian nobility, new series, in 30 volumes

States and cities
In addition to the Libro d'oro of Venice, such books had existed in many of the Italian states and cities before the unification of Italy. For example, the Libro d'Oro of Murano, the glass-making island in the Venetian Lagoon, was instituted in 1602, and from 1605 the heads of the Council of Ten granted the title cittadino di Murano to those heads of families born on the island or resident there for at least twenty-five years. A Libro d'Oro was also compiled on each of the Venetian Ionian Islands as a nobiliary of the members of local Community Councils (Zante 1542, Corfu 1572 and Cephalonia 1593). After the Ionian Islands were conquered and annexed by Napoleon Bonaparte in 1797, the Libro d'Oro was ceremoniously burned.

In the reformed Republic of Genoa of 1576 the Genoese Libro d'Oro, which had been closed in 1528, was reopened to admit new blood.

By extension, a Libro d'Oro is a by-name for any nobiliary directory, as when Al. N. Oikonomides refers to "the recently published 'libro d'oro' of the wealthy ancient Athenians (J.K. Davies, Athenian Propertied Families 600-200 B.C. (Oxford 1971)".

See also
 Annuario della Nobiltà Italiana
 Burke's Peerage, the UK equivalent analogue
Debrett's
 Consulta araldica
 Nobility of Italy
Almanach de Gotha
Carnet Mondain of Belgium
High Life de Belgique
Powerlist
Social Register
 Kulavruttanta

Notes

References 
Libro d'oro at Collegio Araldico (in Italian). Retrieved 5 November 2010
Heraldry in Italy at Heraldica (in English). Retrieved 11 May 2007
Explanation of Italian noble rank at Regalis (in English. Retrieved 8 July  2007

 
Biographical dictionaries